Egemen is a Turkish language given name and surname. It may refer to:

Egemen Bağış (born 1970), Turkish politician
Egemen Güven (born 1996), Turkish basketball player 
Egemen Korkmaz (born 1982), Turkish football player
Sibel Egemen (born 1958), Turkish singer

See also
Egemen, a Kyrgyz political group
Yegemen Qazaqstan, a Kazakhstani newspaper

Turkish-language surnames
Turkish masculine given names